Tickets to the Devil (1968) by Richard P. Powell is novel taking a glimpse into the world of duplicate bridge in the late 1960s. The story features characters loosely based on great players of those days, along with some fictional characters. All of them are competing or involved in a National bridge event set in the fictional Xanadu hotel in Miami Beach, while their stories intersect and interact in a Grand Hotel fashion.

References 

1968 American novels
Contract bridge books
Novels set in hotels